Abd al-Bari is a male given name using the words Abd, al- and Bari, the name means Servant of the Creator.  The name is subject to variable spacing, spelling, and hyphenation.

It may refer to:

Abdul Bari Firangi Mahali (1878–1926), Indian author and pan-Islamist
Abdul Bari Nadvi (1886–1976), Indian author and educationalist
Abdul Bari (professor) (1892–1947), Indian freedom fighter, politician and union leader
Muhammad Abdul Bari (academic) (1930–2003), Vice-Chancellor of Rajshahi University and the Chairman of University Grants Commission
Abdul Bari (squash player) (died 1954), Indian squash player
Abdel Bari Atwan (born 1950), Palestinian-British journalist
Muhammad Abdul Bari (born 1953), Bangladeshi-British Muslim author and community leader
Adel Abdel Bari (born 1960), Egyptian Islamic militant
Abdul Bari (Taliban commander, Helmand)
Abdul Bari (Taliban commander, Uruzgan)
Abdul Bari (Guantanamo captive 753)

See also 

Bari (name)

Arabic masculine given names